The Geltsdale Reservoir railway was a  narrow gauge industrial railway used during the construction of Castle Carrock Reservoir near Carlisle in Cumbria.

Locomotives

See also

 British industrial narrow gauge railways

References

 

3 ft gauge railways in England
Reservoir construction railways
Industrial railways in England
City of Carlisle
Railway lines opened in 1904